A Different Stage may refer to:
 A Different Stage (album), a 2017 album by Jason Manford
 A Different Stage (musical), a one-man show by Gary Barlow